The following table lists the highest and lowest temperatures recorded in each state in Germany, in both Celsius and Fahrenheit. The warmest year on record in Germany was 2018.

Temperature extremes by state

Important: In some federal states, even more extreme values are known to be measured on same or earlier dates. These dubious or unreliable values are not listed in this table unless they passed a basic temporal and spatial consistency & plausibility check (e. g. less than 0.9 °C / 1.6 °F above surrounding stations in German lowlands).  For this reason, the former German record of 42.6 °C / 108.7 °F measured on July 25, 2019 at Lingen (Lower Saxony) is not listed. It was cancelled in December 2020 by the responsible station operator DWD (German weather service).

In some cases, also stations from other operators of meteorological networks were listed if their values met the above stated requirements and could be classified as representative for a larger area.

Notes

External links
Absolute Höchsttemperaturen in Deutschland
Absolute Tiefsttemperaturen in Deutschland
Dekadenrekorde

Climate of Germany
Germany geography-related lists
Germany